The Portland Press Excellence in Science Award was an annual award instituted in 1964 to recognize notable research in any branch of biochemistry undertaken in the UK or Republic of Ireland. It was initially called the CIBA Medal and Prize, then the Novartis Medal and Prize.  The prize consists of a medal and a £3000 cash award. The winner is invited to present a lecture at a Society conference and submit an article to one of the Society's publications. Notable recipients include the Nobel laureates John E. Walker, Paul Nurse, Sydney Brenner, César Milstein, Peter D. Mitchell, Rodney Porter, and John Cornforth.

The Novartis Medal and Prize was last presented in 2019 and will be replaced from 2021 by the Portland Press Excellence in Science Award. Portland Press is the publishing arm of the Biochemical Society.

Recipients
Source: Biochemical Society

 Novartis Medal and Prize

 2021: Bart Vanhaesebroeck

 2019: Caroline Dean  

 2018: Laurence Pearl

 2017: Doreen Cantrell

 2016: 

 2015: 

 2014: 

 2013: Tony Kouzarides

 2012: 

 2011: 

 2010: D. Grahame Hardie

 2009: Louise Johnson

 2008: Stephen C. West

 2007: Adrian Bird

 2006: James Barber

 2005: Alan Hall

 2004: Jean D. Beggs

 2003: Iain D. Campbell

 2002: Michael S. Neuberger

 2001: 

 2000: Kiyoshi Nagai

 1999: Christopher J. Marshall

 1998: Richard N. Perham

 1997: Ronald Laskey

 1996: John E. Walker

 1995: Christopher F. Higgins

 1994: 

 1993: T. Rabbitts

 1992: Philip Cohen

 1991: Paul Nurse

 1988: 

 1987: Thomas L. Blundell

 1985: E. A. Barnard

 1984: Philip J. Randle

 1983: George K. Radda

 1981: I. Helen Muir

 1980: Sydney Brenner

 1979: J. B. Gurdon

 1978: J. Rodney Quayle

 1977: César Milstein

 1976: Samuel V. Perry

 1975: 

 1974: 

 1973: Peter D. Mitchell

 1972: R. T. Williams

 1971: D. H. Northcote

 1970: D. C. Phillips

 1969: 

 1968: William J. Whelan

 1967: D. M. Blow

 1966: R. R. Porter

 1965: J. W. Cornforth and 

Source:

See also

 List of biochemistry awards

References

Biology in the United Kingdom
British science and technology awards
Biochemistry awards
Novartis